David Trimble (June 1782 – October 20, 1842) was a U.S. Representative from Kentucky.

Born in Frederick County, Virginia, in June 1782, Trimble graduated from the College of William and Mary, Williamsburg, Virginia, in 1799.
He studied law. He was admitted to the bar and commenced legal practice in Mount Sterling, Kentucky. He owned slaves.
He served in the War of 1812 as brigade quartermaster of the First Brigade, Kentucky Mounted Militia, and later as a private in the Battalion of Kentucky Mounted Infantry Volunteers commanded by Major Dudley.

Trimble was elected as a Democratic-Republican to the Fifteenth through the Seventeenth Congress.
He was reelected as an Adams-Clay Republican to the Eighteenth Congress and elected as an Adams candidate to the Nineteenth Congress (March 4, 1817 – March 3, 1827). He served as chairman of the Committee on Expenditures in the Department of the Treasury (Sixteenth Congress) and was on the Committee on Elections (Sixteenth Congress). He was an unsuccessful candidate for reelection to the Twentieth Congress.
He died at Trimble's Furnace, Greenup County, Kentucky, October 20, 1842.

References

1782 births
1842 deaths
People from Frederick County, Virginia
Democratic-Republican Party members of the United States House of Representatives from Kentucky
National Republican Party members of the United States House of Representatives from Kentucky
Kentucky lawyers
American slave owners
Quartermasters
American militiamen in the War of 1812
People from Kentucky in the War of 1812